Corinne Cahen is a Luxembourgish politician who has been Minister of Family and Integration and the Greater Region in the Bettel–Schneider Ministry I since 4 December 2013.

She was born on 16 May 1973 in Luxembourg City, and grew up in a Jewish family in the Bonnevoie neighborhood of Luxembourg City. After her high school graduation, she left for France to study translation, business, and journalism. She then worked as a journalist for the AFP and Radio France Internationale, which included a period as a White House correspondent in Washington, D.C. After her return to Luxembourg, she worked for Eldoradio, RTL Radio, and her family's shoe business.

Before entering politics, she was a business woman managing her family's shoe shops in Luxembourg-City and was active as president for the retail business association of Luxembourg City from 2008 to 2012.

References

1973 births
Living people
People from Luxembourg City
Luxembourgian Jews
Alumni of the Athénée de Luxembourg
21st-century Luxembourgian women politicians
21st-century Luxembourgian politicians
Women government ministers of Luxembourg
Luxembourgian politicians
Democratic Party (Luxembourg) politicians